The Cronulla-Sutherland Sharks are an Australian professional rugby league club based in Cronulla, in the Sutherland Shire, Southern Sydney, New South Wales. They compete in the National Rugby League (NRL), Australasia's premier rugby league competition. The Sharks, as they are commonly known, were admitted to the New South Wales Rugby League premiership, predecessor of the Australian Rugby League and the current National Rugby League competition, in January 1967. The club competed in every premiership season since then and, during the Super League war, joined the rebel competition before continuing on in the re-united NRL Premiership. The Sharks have been in competition for 56 years, appearing in four grand finals, winning their first premiership in 2016 after defeating the Melbourne Storm at Stadium Australia.

History

In 1967 the New South Wales Rugby Football League (NSWRFL) added two new clubs to the competition, Cronulla-Sutherland and Penrith, the first to join the competition since Parramatta and Manly were admitted 20 years earlier in 1947.

Founded by Peter Burns, Cronulla debuted in 1967 wearing a sky blue jersey adorned with a white V and red numbers on the back, at the then club home ground of Sutherland Oval, under the captaincy of multiple premiership-winner Monty Porter and the coaching of Ken Kearney. Cronulla earned immediate recognition when they beat Eastern Suburbs at the Sydney Sports Ground in their first match. They had only two more wins, against Norths and Parramatta, and finished last on the competition table.

In mid-1968 the club moved permanently to Endeavour Field at Woolooware, and became the only club in Sydney to own their own ground. Their first match there was against Parramatta and the Cronulla-Sutherland Sharks won 10–7.

1970s
Cronulla made their first grand final in 1973 against Manly-Warringah losing 10–7. Cronulla met the Manly club again in the 1978 grand final, leading 7–2 well into the second half, before Manly came back and brought the scoreboard to 7–11. It took a late penalty goal from Steve Rogers to level scores at 11-all by full-time.  The replay saw the Sharks opportunity pass by as they fielded a much-weakened team due to further injuries, eventually being shut-out by Manly 16–0. Cronulla were without suspended stars Greg Pierce and Dane Sorensen in both games, while hooker John McMartin, fullback Mick Mullane and Barry Andrews were all injured for the replay.

1980s
Cronulla suffered major financial trouble in 1983, with the NSWRL appointing an administrator and providing a loan. Western Suburbs and Newtown, both in a similar predicament, were refused a loan, with Newtown being forced out of the competition. Cronulla also made the final of the mid-week KB Cup, but lost again to Manly, 26–6.

In 1985, Cronulla was buoyed by the arrival of 'super coach' Jack Gibson, who had coached Easts and Parramatta to premierships. Gibson left the club in good shape in 1987, with the promise fulfilled in 1988 when Cronulla won the minor premiership, led by veteran second-rower Gavin Miller, who was named Dally M Player of the Year, and Rothmans Medal winning halfback, Barry Russell. However, Russell dislocated his shoulder two weeks before the finals, and missed the semi-final where Cronulla went down to Canterbury. He was rushed back in for the final against Balmain, but he was severely hampered by the injury, and Cronulla were bundled out. A bright spot for the Sharks, though, was the selection in the Australian team of Miller, and young centres, Ettingshausen and Mark McGaw.

In 1989, Cronulla sneaked into the finals after thrashing Illawarra 46–14 in the final round, followed by a memorable 38–14 victory over the Brisbane Broncos in the play-off for fifth position. However, they could not repeat the performance in their semi-final against eventual premiers Canberra, in what was their third game in seven days. Gavin Miller was rewarded for another great year with both the Dally M Player of the Year award and the Rothmans Medal.

1990s
Cronulla again dropped into a period of poor form and financial trouble in 1990, but the appointment as coach of rugby league Immortal, Arthur Beetson, in 1992 helped turn the on-field problems around. He helped develop a batch of promising players, including five-eighth Mitch Healey, fullback David Peachey, winger Richie Barnett, second-rower Sean Ryan, prop Adam Ritson, and hooker Aaron Raper, son of another Immortal, Johnny Raper. However, Cronulla were forced into receivership in 1993.

Beetson was replaced as coach in 1994 by John Lang, a former Australian hooker, and coach of the Brisbane Easts team. Lang brought halfback, Paul Green, down from Brisbane with him. A golden age for the club had begun, signalled by the two lower grade teams (President's Cup and Reserve grade) winning their competitions. During John Lang's coaching period, from 1994 to 2001, Cronulla made the semi-finals every year except for 1994 and 1998. The club had a glamorous image and attracted record crowds, with a corresponding financial improvement.

In 1995, Cronulla were one of the first clubs to join the Super League competition, which kicked off after protracted legal battles and much bitterness, in 1997. The club was motivated by a dissatisfaction with the perceived favouritism of the NSWRL administration towards other clubs, and a still-risky financial situation.

They reached the inaugural – and only – grand final of the ten-team Super League competition, only to lose to a vastly superior Brisbane side 26–8 in Brisbane. The game was notable for being the first grand final to be played outside Sydney. The club rejoined the reunited National Rugby League competition in 1998.

Arguably Cronulla's best season ever was in 1999, when they again won the Minor Premiership and the J. J. Giltinan Shield in convincing fashion. Cronulla-Sutherland easily accounted for the Brisbane Broncos in the quarter-final, and led 8–0 in the grand final qualifier against arch rivals the St George Illawarra Dragons before eventually losing 8–24. Also in 1999, the Cronulla-Sutherland name was dropped, and the club was simply known as the "Sharks", and would be known as this until the end of 2002.

2000s
Cronulla lost the grand final qualifier in similar circumstances in 2001, to eventual premiers Newcastle. The year was marked by the sudden rise of halfback Preston Campbell, who was named Dally M Player of the Year, despite being a fringe first grader at the start of the season.

In 2002, John Lang was replaced by Australian coach Chris Anderson, who had led Canterbury Bulldogs and Melbourne Storm to premierships. The following two years were the most acrimonious in the club's history. The first year was almost an on-field success, as Anderson retained the core of John Lang's team, and the Sharks again reached the grand final qualifier. However another heartbreaking loss to New Zealand, the replacement of halfback Preston Campbell – a crowd favourite – with former Melbourne halfback Brett Kimmorley, and a string of released players signaled trouble for 2003.

This was realised with the sudden mid-season departure of long-time stalwarts Nick Graham and Dean Treister. The Sharks finished 11th, suffering a record 74–4 loss to Parramatta in a match marred by the controversial performance of referee Shayne Hayne. Three Cronulla players were sent from the field, including Sharks captain David Peachey, for ignoring the referee's instructions. Constant infighting between the board and the coach led to Anderson's departure at the end of the season.

The same year the club's name reverted to Cronulla-Sutherland, Chris Anderson was replaced by Stuart Raper, another son of Johnny Raper, and the coach of the President's Cup-winning team in 1994. A loyal clubman, he instantly brought a revival in club and supporter spirit. However, Raper's apparent focus on team harmony rather than results led to Cronulla's win percentage worsening, from 49% (24 wins 27 losses) under Anderson, to 43% (31 wins 42 losses).

Steve Rogers, the CEO of the Cronulla Sharks and a former club legend, died on 3 January 2006 at the age of 51 of a "mixture of prescription drugs and alcohol". In April, 2006, the NSW state coroner ruled that the death was accidental.

On 21 April 2006, after much work and lobbying carried out by then-Chairman Barry Pierce and Sharks board member Brian Quinn, Peter Costello, on behalf of the Federal Government, announced they would be funding a $9.6 million upgrade to Toyota Park. The funds were primarily used to construct the Southern Stand which was never completed but later named the Monty Porter Stand.

Cronulla finished the 2006 season in disastrous fashion. After winning 8 out of 9 games in the middle of the season and climbing to near the top of the ladder, the team experienced the worst losing streak in the club's history, losing their last 10 consecutive games. In a see-sawing match to finish a tumultuous season, the Sharks in their final game coming back from 26–0 down only to lose 26–24 to Canberra. A missed penalty goal in the dying seconds of the match would have sent the game into extra-time, allowing the chance for Cronulla to equal the biggest single-game comeback in the history of top-level rugby league in Australia.

On 22 September 2006, the Sharks Board ended weeks of speculation over the future of Coach Stuart Raper by sacking him as first-grade coach and handing him a sizeable payout, making him the second consecutive coach to receive such a payout. On 26 September, Australian Test Coach Ricky Stuart signed a three-year deal to coach the Sharks as of 2007, replacing Raper.

Round one of the 2007 NRL season saw Cronulla-Sutherland break their 10-game losing streak against the Penrith Panthers with an 18–0 victory at Toyota Park. Ricky Stuart led the Sharks to fifth on the ladder at the halfway mark of the season surprising many critics. Towards the end of the season, Cronulla plunged to 15th on the league ladder, slumping to seven straight losses. The season ended with the Sharks in 11th place, rounding off a heartbreaking season, with the club losing no less than nine matches by 4 points or less.

Cronulla-Sutherland had a strong season in 2008, finishing the season in equal first spot (third on for and against). They had one of the best defensive records, but one of the worst attacking records in the league. They had an excellent start to the season, beating defending grand finalists Manly and premiers Melbourne in away games in the first two rounds.  After a comprehensive 36–10 victory over Canberra in the Qualifying Final at Toyota Stadium, Cronulla were beaten 28–0 by Melbourne (who later were found to be over the salary cap and cheating) in the Preliminary Final at the Sydney Football Stadium. This was a disappointing end to an otherwise successful season.

During the 2009 season Cronulla's dire financial problems became public knowledge. Asset-rich, owning its stadium and the surrounding land, but with cash flow problems due to its low average home gate and poor on-field performances in recent seasons, the club announced plans for a partial relocation to the Central Coast, which was rebuffed by the NRL. It was to split home games for the 2010–14 seasons among:

 6 at Endeavour Field, to include local derbies with the St George Illawarra Dragons and Canterbury-Bankstown Bulldogs,
 5 at Central Coast Stadium in Gosford, Central Coast, and
 1 at Hindmarsh Stadium in Adelaide, South Australia.

In May 2009, an ABC Four Corners investigation revealed the Sharks players involvement in a group sex scandal on a pre-season tour in 2002. The club further slid into crisis when it also emerged that CEO Tony Zappia had allegedly punched a female staff member and joked about it. Zappia and Coach Ricky Stuart also then attempted to bully the female staff member into retracting her complaint.

Zappia and Stuart were also investigated for their role around unusual financial transactions with Clint Elford, a fan who falsely claimed to be terminally ill, and who had sent money to Zappia and Stuart to spend on the Sharks . Elford was subsequently found guilty of fraud and Stuart refused to answer questions when the NRL launched an investigation. CEO Tony Zappia was investigated and subsequently sacked for his role.

On 26 May 2009 businessman Damian Irvine, together with a fresh board of directors, took over control of the club as the St George bank were threatening to foreclose.

They recorded 9 straight losses after a win in Round 1 in 2009 and despite a midseason revival with four straight wins, the Cronulla side slipped to ten straight defeats to equal the club's worst losing streak. One of these losses caused great controversy as the Sharks, playing against Manly, were forced to field just 12 men for most of the game after Luke Douglas was sent off by referee Phil Haines for a careless high tackle. The Sharks managed to avoid the wooden spoon in 2009 when the Roosters were soundly beaten by the Cowboys in the final round, resulting in a lower overall standing than the Sharks. Avoiding last position was a rare positive in a horror season for the Cronulla club.

2010s

2010
The start of the 2010 season saw Cronulla return confident of turning around recent disappointing results, however on-field performance remained poor. After the board developed a plan to refinance debt and a long-term financial strategy, Richard Fisk resigned in June 2010 due to his failure to find common ground with Chairman Irvine and his Board and a failure by Fisk to refresh the commercial area of the club. The club's head coach, Ricky Stuart, also tendered his resignation and was replaced towards the back end of the season by his then-assistant coach Shane Flanagan.

Promising wing/centre Blake Ferguson was criticized for comments about wanting to leave the club in order to achieve success. On Tuesday, 20 July Ricky Stuart left the Sharks for the rest of the season after admitting he could get no more out of the players and had "lost" them. Chairman Irvine opted to give a chance to Assistant NSW and Cronulla coach Shane Flanagan. After departing, Stuart also cited a fractured relationship with Chairman Damian Irvine as a reason for his departure despite the club making positive strides off-field under his guidance and commitment and Irvine making funds available to back Stuart in the player market as he wished.

2011
The 2011 season started so promising for the club. The addition of Wade Graham at five-eighth and New Zealand international Jeremy Smith to a pack already containing two origin players promised an end to the Sharks' status as cellar-dwellers. Despite being humiliated by Canberra at Canberra Stadium in round one, 40–12, the club won its next two matches. They beat defending premiers St. George Illawarra 16–10 at home in round two, and smashed Penrith 44–12 at Centerbet Stadium. Missing a number of first-team starters due to injury, Cronulla then lost five in a row to the New Zealand Warriors (26-18), Manly-Warringah Sea Eagles (19-13), Newcastle Knights (24-20), North Queensland Cowboys (30-12), and South Sydney (31-12), dropping down the table, from 9th to 15th.

They broke their hoodoo in round ten, when they beat the struggling Sydney Roosters 18–4 at Toyota Stadium. They were again disappointing in round eleven, when they were defeated 40-6 by Parramatta at Parramatta Stadium. Despite losing 14–8 to the Storm in round 12, they were much improved and forced Melbourne into a classic showdown at AAMI Park in Melbourne. They then faced Brisbane at home in round 13, going down 34–16, before a bye in round 14 gave them the chance to regroup. While the Sharks were taking a much needed break skipper Paul Gallen led the NSW Blues Origin team to a memorable 18–8 victory over Queensland. He then played outstandingly for the Sharks in their round 15 match against Canterbury-Bankstown just three days after the State of Origin match, a game in which Cronulla beat Canterbury-Bankstown 26–10. The next four weeks saw a turnaround of the club's performance, with victory over the Gold Coast Titans 36-12 and the South Sydney Rabbitohs 24–4, before they took revenge against the Canberra Raiders 26–12.

2012
Cronulla lost their two props for the 2012 season, Origin representative Kade Snowden to Newcastle and Luke Douglas signing for the Gold Coast Titans. Captain Paul Gallen's transformation into an Origin prop alleviated this problem somewhat, and the Sharks were active in the player market, signing prop Jon Green from St George, former Shark Isaac de Gois, prop Mark Taufua from Newcastle, halfback Jeff Robson from Parramatta and props Bryce Gibbs and Andrew Fifita from Wests Tigers.

2012 began very well for the club under Chairman Damian Irvine, Coach Shane Flanagan. The recruitment by Mooney and Flanagan paid dividends with new recruits Jeff Robson, Andrew Fifita, Todd Carney, Ben Ross, Isaac De Gois and Mark Taufua taking pressure off Paul Gallen allowing him to hit a purple patch of form. The club won 6 matches in a row for the first time in over a decade and after 8 rounds were sitting third on the table as the highest placed Sydney based franchise.

A difficult State of Origin period saw injuries to captain Paul Gallen and star Todd Carney. Cronulla struggled to recover and struggled in the back half of the year, however still capped a remarkable turnaround by qualifying for their first finals series in 4 years, losing to Canberra in week one. The match notable for seeing Paul Gallen outplayed by young rival Josh Papalii and Todd Carney injuring his Achilles.

Sponsorship deals with SHARK Energy Drink, Fishermans Friends, and Luxbet flooded in and helped the financial situation off-field, with the close of Season 2012 seeing Shane Flanagan emerge as one of the game's leading up and coming head coaches and his mentor Damian Irvine the game's leading young administrator.

2013
At the beginning of Season 2013, Irvine stood down as chairman on learning of the questionable operational and duty of care practices of coach Shane Flanagan, and Darren Mooney during 2011 which exposed the club to the ASADA scandal. Flanagan was stood down and Peter Sharp stepped up to the head coaching role. Flanagan returned in 2013, a season in which the Sharks qualified for the competition semi finals, before he was forced to serve a 9-month suspension handed down by the NRL for breaches of basic governance and duty of care practices, thus validating the strong ethical stance made by Irvine and the board in March 2013.

Sharp again took over the reins, before resigning mid season the week after the club's greatest comeback victory, with the team coming from 22 nil down to beat the Brisbane Broncos 24–22. Following that win, a photo went viral of Sharks playmaker Todd Carney pretending to urinate into his own mouth. Just one day after Carney was stood down by Cronulla CEO Steve Noyce, Sharp resigned as interim head coach and was replaced by James Shepherd.

2014–2015
The 2014 season saw a myriad of struggles for Cronulla on the field, with injuries and the suspension of five players involved in the supplements scandal of 2011, missing games at the back end of the season.  Cronulla finished 2014 with the Wooden Spoon.

In 2015, the club climbed the ladder to eventually finish 6th with two wins over eventual minor premiers Sydney Roosters and 2014's premiers South Sydney. 2015 was also the year Flanagan was reappointed as coach of Cronulla after sitting out the 2014 NRL season. The club would reach the second week of the finals series where they were defeated 39-0 by North Queensland in Townsville.

2016
The 2016 NRL season started with a 20–14 loss over 2015 premiers, North Queensland Cowboys. This was followed by a 30–2 win over the St. George Illawarra Dragons and a loss to Manly-Warringah, 22–12. Cronulla then went on to win 15 games in a row from Round 4 against the Melbourne Storm to Round 21, against the Gold Coast Titans, resulting in an 18-all draw. This was the largest win streak in the club's history. During this period Cronulla equalled their largest win score by defeating the Newcastle Knights 62–0.

They then went on to win 1 out of their last 5 games resulting in a drop from 1st to 3rd. In round 26, the Cronulla-Sutherland and Melbourne Storm faced off in a minor premiership showdown in which the Melbourne Storm won 26–6 in AAMI Park. They went on to defeat the Raiders in the Week 1 qualifying final 16-14 and earning the week off. Advancing to the Preliminary final, they defeated defending premiers North Queensland Cowboys 32–20 at the Sydney Football Stadium. They would face and defeat the Melbourne Storm in the 2016 NRL Grand Final. Cronulla, after leading 8–0 at half-time, prevailed in a gripping affair 14–12 to claim their first premiership in the club's 50-year history. Cronulla second rower Luke Lewis was awarded the Clive Churchill Medal as Man of the Match.

Soon after the Maiden premiership victory stat player Ben Barba tested positive for Cocaine and was sacked from the club. Chairman Damian Keogh, who rose to the position on a platform of promising good governance and increased commercial experience garnered from his role as CEO of HOYTS Australia, was also arrested for possession of Cocaine whilst in Sydney's CBD and resigned from the position of Sharks Chairman as a result.

2017 World Club Challenge and 2017 season
Cronulla played Wigan Warriors at the DW Stadium on 19 February 2017, losing 22–6 to a strong Wigan side. In the 2017 NRL season, Cronulla reached the finals. In week one, Cronulla played against North Queensland in the elimination final. Cronulla went on to be upset 15-14 and were eliminated from the finals ending their premiership defence.

2018 and financial struggles
In the 2018 NRL season, Cronulla-Sutherland finished 4th on the table and qualified for the finals.  The club would eventually reach the preliminary final but were defeated by Melbourne 22–6 at AAMI Park.

In November 2018, the Sharks sack 10 staff members after $3m loss for 2018 season.

On 19 December 2018, Cronulla head coach Shane Flanagan was de-registered as a coach indefinitely for failing to adhere to the conditions of his suspension in 2014.  The NRL integrity unit had found that Flanagan had sent more than fifty emails exchanged between Flanagan, club management and the football department which was strictly against the conditions of his suspension which included that Flanagan was to have no contact or involvement with the club during his ban. The NRL also fined Cronulla $800,000 as punishment.

During the 2019 preseason, on 29 November, it was confirmed that Cronulla would be forced into sacking 10 staff members to help their financial situation. It was reported that Cronulla had lost $3 million, despite being given support of the NRL.

2019
On 31 July 2019, it was revealed by the Sydney Morning Herald that Cronulla would be moving their home games away from Shark Park for two seasons as part of the club's redevelopment of the Cronulla Leagues Club and Shark Park itself.

At the end of the 2019 regular season, Cronulla finished 7th on the table with 12 wins and 12 losses and qualified for the finals. In the elimination final against Manly, Cronulla lost 28–16 at Brookvale Oval which ended their season.

2020s

2020
Cronulla-Sutherland finished 8th on the table in the 2020 NRL season and qualified for the finals after recovering from a poor start to the year. Cronulla were then eliminated in the first week of the finals losing to Canberra 32–20 at GIO Stadium.

2021
Cronulla started the 2021 NRL season two wins from their opening five games. Following the club's 28–16 loss against the Sydney Roosters, head coach John Morris was terminated from his position and replaced with interim head coach Josh Hannay. The club would then go on to lose their next five matches in a row. Cronulla then recovered to sit in eighth place with two games remaining of the regular season. In the final round of the year, Cronulla-Sutherland lost 28–16 against Melbourne and the Gold Coast leapfrogged them into eighth place after they defeated the New Zealand Warriors. Cronulla finished the season in ninth place and missed out on the finals for the first time since 2014.

2022
Cronulla surprised many in the 2022 NRL season after finishing second on the table at the end of the regular season.  Throughout the year, Cronulla went on a six-game winning run.  In the finals series, Cronulla were defeated 31-30 by North Queensland in the qualifying final which was played at Shark Park.  Cronulla had lead the match 30–22 with less than ten minutes to go before North Queensland forced the game into extra-time.  Former Cronulla player Valentine Holmes kicked the winning field goal for North Queensland.  The following week, Cronulla were defeated 38-12 by South Sydney in the elimination final which ended their season.

Emblem, colours, and song

Logo 
The club wasn't known as the Sharks until after its initial admission into the competition. During Cronulla's first season the crest featured a drawing of Captain Cook's ship, . It is alleged that during the first season the club President suggested the 'Lions' while the captain Ken Kearney recommended the 'Sharks'. The mascot may have been named after the Cronulla Surf Club's rugby league teams of the 1970s.
From the late 1970s through to the late 1990s, the Sharks used a predominantly black circular crest with a blue shark. This was changed after Super League in 1997 to a blue and white star-shaped design. Between 1999 and 2002, the name was shortened to simply the "Sharks". Since 2003, the name has since been changed back to the Cronulla-Sutherland Sharks and changed their logo again in 2004, which is currently in use.

For Cronulla's maiden season in first grade a teal jersey with a white V was adopted from the Cronulla Surf Life Saving Club despite Cronulla's chocolate and gold design in the Sydney 2nd Division competition. The team colours of black, white and teal changed to sky blue, with grey being incorporated during Super League, and shortly after on the team's away strip.

Primary jerseys

Cronulla's club song is known as Up Up Cronulla, and is set to the tune of Beer Barrel Polka.

Stadium
When the Sharks entered the competition in 1967, they played their home games at Sutherland Oval. They only played there for two seasons with the Sharks winning their first game at the ground on 22 April 1967 NSWRFL season. The record attendance for Sutherland Oval was set in the last Cronulla game played at the ground when 12,578 saw the Sharks go down 32–4 to Canterbury Bankstown, then known as the Berries, now Bulldogs on 16 June 1968 NSWRFL season. Overall, the Sharks compiled a record of 4 wins, 11 losses and 1 draw at the venue.

In 1969, they then moved to Endeavour Field, where they have remained. This home ground has had numerous names over the years including Ronson Field, Shark Park, Toyota Park and until the end of 2012, Toyota Stadium. In 2013, it returned to the original name Endeavour Field. On 4 July 2013, the Cronulla Sharks announced their new stadium naming rights partner Remondis, an international waste solutions and management company.

In 2016 a new sponsorship deal for naming rights was signed with Southern Cross Group to name the stadium Southern Cross Group Stadium. The new partnership with Southern Cross Group (SCGroup) is a three-year deal, reportedly worth $1.5 million.

Southern Cross Group Stadium has a capacity of 22,000 people with the record attendance of 22,302 being set for a game against local rivals the St George Illawarra Dragons on 1 May 2004

Sharkies Leagues Club

The Cronulla Sutherland Leagues Club is known as Sharkies, and is located on Captain Cook Drive at Woolooware. The leagues club sits beside the Cronulla Sutherland home ground, Endeavour Field.

Proposals to develop the land assets of the Leagues Club which owns the stadium and land around Endeavour Field stumbled for many years prior to arrival of renowned businessman Damian Irvine. In partnership with his head of finance Craig Douglas the plans finally became more tangible, as details of a residential and shopping centre were released. In August 2012, the club received final approval for their plans solving a 40-year-old problem of financial instability.

The arrival of respected CEO Lyall Gorman has seen 2016 be a watershed year off and on-field for the Sharks.

2023 squad

2023 Signings & Transfers

Gains
 Brad Fearnley – Penrith Panthers
 Oregon Kaufusi – Parramatta Eels 
 Henry O'Kane – Wests Tigers

Losses
 Luke Metcalf – New Zealand Warriors 
 Franklin Pele – Canterbury-Bankstown Bulldogs 
 Jordan Samrani – Canterbury-Bankstown Bulldogs 
 Andrew Fifita – Retirement
 Aiden Tolman – Retirement

Players

Sharks Immortals
The club has honoured five individuals as "Immortals" of the club:
Tommy Bishop, player-coach (1969–74)
Greg Pierce, player (1969–80) and coach (1981–82)
Steve Rogers, player (1973–85) and CEO
Gavin Miller, player (1980–92)
Andrew Ettingshausen, player (1983–2000)

Representative players

Club captains

1 – Unknown number of matches as captain between 1972 and 1976.

Dream Team
Announced 2006

Team of the Half Century
Announced 2017

Club Legends
Announced 2003

Cliff Watson
Greg Pierce
Mark McGaw
Steve Rogers
Andrew Ettingshausen
Mat Rogers
Tommy Bishop
Gavin Miller
David Hatch
David Peachey

Team of the Decade
Announced 2020

Award winners

Dally M Medal
Steve Rogers (1981)
Gavin Miller (1988, 1989)
Preston Campbell (2001)
Nicho Hynes (2022)

Rothmans Medal
Terry Hughes (1968)
Ken Maddison (1973)
Steve Rogers (1975)
Barry Russell (1988)
Gavin Miller (1989)
Paul Green (1995)

Club Player of the Year (Porter Gallen Medal)

Clive Churchill Medal
Luke Lewis (2016)

Coaches register

Honours
Premierships: 1 (2016)

Runners-Up: 3 (1973, 1978, 1997SL)

Minor Premierships: 2 (1988, 1999)

Wooden Spoons: 3 (1967, 1969, 2014)

Finals Appearances: 24 (1973, 1978, 1979, 1981, 1988, 1989, 1995, 1996 1997, 1999, 2000, 2001 2002, 2004, 2008, 2012, 2013, 2015, 2016, 2017, 2018, 2019, 2020, 2022)

Amco Cup: (1979)

Head-to-head records

Rivalries

Manly-Warringah Sea Eagles

This rivalry has been dubbed the "Battle of the Beaches", due to the geographical locations of the two clubs. Manly played the Sharks in two grand finals: 1973 and 1978, which are renowned for being the most brutal in history. Manly won both of these deciders, 10–7 in 1973 and 16–0 in the 1978 replay after the first game ended at 11-all. The Sea Eagles have traditionally had much success over the Sharks, with Cronulla winning at Manly's home ground just five times in their history. However the Sharks' biggest ever win came against Manly, a 68-6 thrashing in 2005. Cronulla and Manly play for the Steve Rogers Trophy when the two clubs meet in the NRL premiership each season. The two teams met in the 2013 finals, when Manly held off Cronulla by 24–18. Most recently the two teams met in the 2019 finals, when Manly beat Cronulla 28–16 at Brookvale Oval.

St. George Illawarra Dragons
Dragons vs Sharks Rivalry

Cronulla's fiercest rivalry is with their Southern Sydney neighbour, St George Illawarra Dragons. The success of the St. George club has often seen Cronulla labeled as the 'little brother' to the Dragons, further emphasised by the Dragons joint-venture with the Illawarra Steelers in 1998, effectively surrounding the Cronulla-Sutherland region geographically.  On ANZAC Day 1999, Cronulla CEO Peter Gow famously cut up a St. George jersey with a pair of scissors in front of onlookers at Cronulla's leagues club and assaulted former St. George player Barry Beath who had become involved in the situation.  Gow was later sacked by Cronulla for defacing the jersey and for assaulting a club patron.

Despite this the head-to-head match-up between the two clubs is surprisingly even. The two teams always lift the intensity when they meet, which has led to some classic matches over the years.  In the 1999 preliminary final, Cronulla-Sutherland had won the minor premiership and looked like cruising to the grand final, before St George Illawarra scored 24 unanswered second half points to win 24–8. They would meet again in the finals in 2002, with Cronulla winning 40–24, and again in 2005 when St George Illawarra won 28–22.

Melbourne Storm
A fairly recent rivalry that reached its height in the 2016 NRL Grand Final which was won by Cronulla.

Round 2 of the 2008 NRL season saw the sides meet at Olympic Park in Melbourne, and Cronulla was able to reverse the result by the same scoreline via a Brett Kimmorley field goal. The match was marred by an ugly brawl which saw Cronulla's Ben Ross and Melbourne's Brett White sent from the field. It was the only loss Melbourne suffered at home during the 2008 regular season.

The two sides met again in the preliminary final where Melbourne, despite missing captain Cameron Smith to suspension, defeated Cronulla 28–0 to advance to the grand final against Manly-Warringah.

Melbourne began the 2012 NRL season with nine straight victories, before a Paul Gallen-less Sharks pipped them 12-10 thanks to a Jeremy Smith try and clutch conversion from Todd Carney. It looked like Cronulla would land two wins over Melbourne that year, leading 18–10 with 90 seconds to go in the second game between the sides.

Melbourne somehow scored twice to win 20–18. The competitive rivalry between the two sides officially began in late 2015 when Melbourne beat Cronulla 30–2 in spiteful circumstances. Cronulla coach Shane Flanagan accused Melbourne of slowing down the game with their wrestling tackle technique. The loss meant that Melbourne leap-frogged Cronulla into 4th place heading into the finals. Again Cronulla-Sutherland handed Melbourne their first loss of the 2016 NRL season, winning the round 4 clash 14–6. It was the first match in Cronulla's record-breaking 15 matches winning streak.

The two sides would meet in the final round of the regular season with the winner taking out the minor premiership. Melbourne won 26-6 and took out the JJ Giltinan Shield. However, Cronulla-Sutherland would win the biggest game ever between the two sides 4 weeks later, winning the 2016 grand final by 14–12 in a thriller.

The two teams traded close wins in 2017, with Cronulla winning 11–2 at AAMI Park before Melbourne returned serve with an 18–13 victory at Southern Cross Group Stadium. 2018 saw Cronulla win both encounters with Melbourne during the regular season, yet despite this, lost to them in the preliminary final 22 to 6.

The match featured a controversial moment when Melbourne player Billy Slater made an illegal tackle on Cronulla winger Sosaia Feki while he was in the act of scoring, therefore constituting a professional foul. Slater managed to avoid the Sin Bin despite being penalised for the action, as well as avoiding suspension, with the NRL judiciary controversially ruling that the tackle did not constitute a shoulder charge. Their round 4 clash in 2018 saw a record 33 penalties blown, and Cameron Smith was sin-binned for the first time in his career.

In the 2021 NRL season, former Melbourne player Will Chambers signed a contract to join Cronulla-Sutherland which closed the chapter of the two sides competitive rivalry.  Chambers had previously labelled Cronulla captain Paul Gallen and other Cronulla players as "Drug Cheats" during a 2017 game between the two sides.

Supporters
The Cronulla-Sutherland Sharks receive support from groups of fans, including the "Cronulla-Sutherland Supporters Club", supporter's website "Sharks Forever", and fan forum "Sharks Forever".

Cronulla-Sutherland Sharks fans became widely known for the 'Spirit Fingers', when someone has a Place kick.

Notable Celebrity Supporters of the club:

| valign=top |
 Lara Bingle, Australian model and actress
 John Boldeman, Australian nuclear scientist
 Stuart Clark, former Australian cricketer
 Bill Collins, Australian film critic and author
 Peter Costello, former Federal Treasurer of Australia
 Brendan Cowell, Australian actor, screenwriter, comedian and director
 Dave Faulkner, Australian rock musician
 Cathy Freeman, Australian former sprinter
 Samuel Johnson, Australian actor, radio presenter, voiceover artist and philanthropist
| valign=top |
 Brendan Jones, Australian radio presenter
 Daniel MacPherson, Australian actor and television presenter
 Elle Macpherson, Australian model
 Glenn McGrath, former Australian international cricketer and commentator
 Scott Morrison, 30th Prime Minister of Australia
 Shannon Noll, Australian singer-songwriter
 Mark Occhilupo, Australian surfer
 Glenn Wheeler Australian radio personality
 Markus Zusak, Australian writer

Women's team

References

External links

Official Cronulla Sharks website
Official Cronulla Sharks Membership website
Official Cronulla Sharks Merchandise website
Official Cronulla Sharks Leagues Club website
Cronulla Sharks image and news archive, with game stats back to 1967

 
National Rugby League clubs
Rugby league teams in Sydney
Rugby clubs established in 1963
1963 establishments in Australia
Fan-owned football clubs
NRL Women's Premiership clubs